Profilo Shopping Center, opened in 1997, is a shopping mall located in the business quarter of Mecidiyeköy, Istanbul, Turkey.

See also
 List of shopping malls in Istanbul

References
 From the Grand Bazaar to the modern shopping centers in Turkey. Turkish Council of Shopping Centers & Retailers (AMPD)

External links
 Official website of Profilo Shopping Center 

Shopping malls in Istanbul
Şişli